The Singles Collection, Volume 1 is a collection of non-album tracks by Dropkick Murphys. It is the American version of The Early Years which was released in Europe, although with some track changes. This album contains everything the band recorded before their first album, Do or Die, except for the Boys on the Docks EP and compilation tracks from I've Got My Friends and Runt of the Litter Volume 2, as well as exclusive live tracks.

Song information
The album includes six covers: The Clash's "Career Opportunities", "Guns of Brixton" and "White Riot"; The Pogues' "Billy Bones"; and Slapshot's "I've Had Enough" are standalone tracks, while the band also covers AC/DC's "T.N.T." during the song "Skinhead on the MBTA (Live)."

Track listing
All songs by Dropkick Murphys unless otherwise noted.
 "Barroom Hero" – 3:09
 "Fightstarter Karaoke" – 2:33
 "John Law" – 2:15
 "Regular Guy" – 1:53
 "3rd Man In" – 2:19
 "Career Opportunities (Live)" (Joe Strummer, Mick Jones) – 1:53
 "Never Alone" – 3:18
 "Take It or Leave It" – 2:02
 "Eurotrash" – 1:36
 "Front Seat" – 2:33
 "Denial" – 2:24
 "Billy's Bones" (Shane MacGowan) – 2:03
 "Road of the Righteous" – 2:50
 "Guns of Brixton" (Paul Simonon) – 2:47 (studio, erroneously credit as being live on the CD)
 "Cadence to Arms (Live)" (Traditional, Dropkick Murphys) – 2:26
 "Do or Die (Live)" – 1:48
 "In the Streets of Boston (Live)" – 1:14
 "Never Alone (Live)" – 2:40
 "Get Up (Live)" – 2:05
 "Far Away Coast (Live)" – 2:46
 "Boys on the Docks (Live)" – 2:53
 "Skinhead on the MBTA (Live)" (contains cover of "T.N.T." by AC/DC) (Traditional, Dropkick Murphys, Angus Young, Malcolm Young, Bon Scott) – 4:45
 "I've Had Enough (Live)" (Jack Kelly, Slapshot) – 1:42
 "White Riot (Live)" (Joe Strummer, Mick Jones) – 1:48

Personnel
Mike McColgan – vocals
Ken Casey – bass guitar, vocals
Rick Barton – guitar
Matt Kelly – drums on live tracks
Jeff Erna – drums on all studio tracks and "Career Opportunities" (live)

References

Dropkick Murphys albums
B-side compilation albums
2000 compilation albums
Hellcat Records compilation albums